Osman v United Kingdom was a case heard by the European Court of Human Rights on human rights law in the United Kingdom. Judgment was given on 28 October 1998.

Facts
The applicants were British citizens resident in London. The first applicant, Mulkiye Osman, was the widow of Ali Osman, who was shot dead by Paul Paget-Lewis on 7 March 1988. The second applicant, Ahmet Osman, was her son, born in 1972. He was a former pupil of Paget-Lewis at Homerton House School, and was wounded in the shooting which led to the death of his father.

The applicants' complaints were directed at the failure of the authorities to appreciate and act on what they claim was a series of clear warning signs that Paget-Lewis represented a serious threat to the physical safety of Ahmet Osman and his family. The applicants argued that the police had been given information which should have made it clear that the individual posed a danger.

Judgment

The English courts all agreed that the police owed no duty of care to the applicants, confirming the law in Hill v Chief Constable of West Yorkshire where it was ruled that the police owed no duty of care to one of the victims of the Yorkshire Ripper. On appeal to Strasbourg, the ruling of the European Court of Human Rights was that such blanket immunity would be a breach of article 6 of the European Convention on Human Rights, but that there was no breach of articles 2 and 8.

See also
 Death threat

Notes

References
CA Gearty, 'Unravelling Osman' (2001) 64(2) Modern Law Review 159

External links
ECHR judgment

1998 in case law
Article 2 of the European Convention on Human Rights
Article 6 of the European Convention on Human Rights
Article 8 of the European Convention on Human Rights
European Court of Human Rights cases involving the United Kingdom
English tort case law
1998 in British law